Isanthrene porphyria is a moth of the subfamily Arctiinae. It was described by Francis Walker in 1854. It is found in Suriname and Brazil (Amazon, Ega, Para).

References

 

Euchromiina
Moths described in 1854